Chaetopleura is a genus of chitons in the family Chaetopleuridae. The species within this genus are marine molluscs.

Taxonomy
The genus has been separated into two subgenera.

subgenus Chaetopleura (Shuttleworth, 1853)
  Chaetopleura angolensis Thiele, 1909
  Chaetopleura angulata (Spengler, 1797)
  Chaetopleura apiculata (Say in Conrad, 1834)
  Chaetopleura asperior (Carpenter in Pilsbry, 1892)
  Chaetopleura asperrima (Couthoy MS, Gould, 1852)
  Chaetopleura benaventei Plate, 1899
  Chaetopleura benguelensis Kaas & Van Belle, 1987
  Chaetopleura biarmata de Rochebrune, 1882
  Chaetopleura brucei Iredale in Melvill & Standen, 1912
  Chaetopleura debruini (Strack, 1996)
  Chaetopleura fernandensis Plate, 1899
  Chaetopleura gambiensis (de Rochebrune, 1881)
  Chaetopleura hanselmani (Ferreira, 1982)
  Chaetopleura hennahi (Gray, 1828)
  Chaetopleura isabellei (d'Orbigny, 1841)
  Chaetopleura lurida (Sowerby in Broderip & Sowerby, 1832)
  Chaetopleura papilio (Spengler, 1797)
  Chaetopleura pertusa (Reeve, 1847)
  Chaetopleura peruviana (Lamarck, 1819)
  Chaetopleura pomarium Barnard, 1963
  Chaetopleura pustulata (Krauss, 1848)
  Chaetopleura roddai Ferreira, 1983
  Chaetopleura shyana Ferreira, 1983
  Chaetopleura sowerbyana (Reeve, 1847)
  Chaetopleura staphylophera Lyons, 1985
  Chaetopleura unilineata Leloup, 1954

subgenus Pallochiton (Dall, 1879)
 Chaetopleura gemma Carpenter MS, Dall, 1879
 Chaetopleura lanuginosa

References

External links 

Chaetopleuridae
Extant Oligocene first appearances
Chiton genera